Gmina Ścinawa is an urban-rural gmina (administrative district) in Lubin County, Lower Silesian Voivodeship, in south-western Poland.

Neighbouring gminas
Gmina Ścinawa is bordered by the gminas of Lubin, Prochowice, Rudna, Wińsko and Wołów.

Villages
Apart from the town of Ścinawa, the gmina contains the villages of Buszkowice, Chełmek Wołowski, Dąbrowa Środkowa, Dębiec, Dłużyce, Dziesław, Dziewin, Grzybów, Jurcz, Krzyżowa, Lasowice, Parszowice, Przybów, Przychowa, Przystań, Redlice, Ręszów, Sitno, Turów, Tymowa, Wielowieś and Zaborów.

Twin towns – sister cities

Gmina Ścinawa is twinned with:
 Niemberg (Landsberg), Germany

References

Scinawa
Lubin County